Telepholis is an extinct genus of prehistoric bony fish that lived from the Cenomanian to Campanian.

Species 

Species in the genus Telepholis as reported in Dietze (2009):

Telepholis acrocephalus, von der Marck and Schlüter, 1868 (Type species)
Telepholis tenuis, Davis 1887

Location/Distribution 

Type Locality: Sendenhorst (Westphalia, Germany)

Holotype and known collections specimens 

The Holotype is specimen "GIM-8434". As reported in Dietze's study : "Complete specimen with poorly preserved head, standard length ca. 112 mm"

Standard length of 3 specimens (GIM-8425, GIM-8434 and IPB-1631) : 112-160 mm (11.2 - 11.6 cm).

See also 

 Prehistoric fish
 List of prehistoric bony fish

References

Late Cretaceous fish
Prehistoric fish of Africa